Cerro Chao is a lava flow complex associated with the Cerro del León volcano in the Andes. It is the largest known Quaternary silicic volcano body and part of the most recent phase of activity in the Altiplano–Puna volcanic complex.

Cerro Chao formed over the course of three eruptions preceded by a pyroclastic stage. The eruption that originated the lava flows probably lasted more than one hundred years and occurred before the Holocene.

Geology 
Cerro Chao, also named Cerros de Chao, Chao lava or Chao volcano, is located in the volcanic front of the Central Volcanic Zone of the Andes, between the older Paniri and Cerro del León andesitic stratovolcanoes. The Central Volcanic Zone is one of the three volcanic belts in the Andes.

The region is dominated by the Altiplano–Puna volcanic complex, where during the Miocene–Pleistocene epoch large ignimbrite eruptions occurred. In the present day, volcanism is of andesitic composition forming volcanic cones. Activity is controlled by fault zones, some of these linked to the Pastos Grandes caldera. Neighbouring volcanoes with similar characteristics to Cerro Chao include Cerro Chanca/Pabellon, Cerro Chascon–Runtu Jarita complex, Cerro Chillahuita and La Torta. Cerro Chao is the largest such silicic lava flow known.

The eruption is intriguing both in terms of the viscosity of the erupted lavas and its effusive nature. Conventional lava flows increase in viscosity with increasing crystal content; however Chao lava flows were erupted with similar viscosities and yield strengths as silicic domes. The formation of a lava flow instead of a lava dome may have been influenced by the formation of a carapace on the flow and the steep slopes the flows initially formed on; the late Chao III flow formed on the very gentle slope left by the previous Chao I and Chao II flows and shows some lava dome characteristics.

Origins 
The andesite inclusions contained in the lava are characteristic for magma mixing processes. The eruption forming the flow may have been caused by the injection of andesite in a pre-existent homogenous dacitic magma chamber. The injection did presumably modify the crystallization processes in the magma chamber and the volatiles in the magma to the point of forcing an eruption.

The magmas that gave rise to Cerro Chao may either be the remnants of a previous magma body that gave rise to the neighbouring calderas of the Altiplano-Puna volcanic complex, or may be the sign of a new injection of magmas in the crust. The significance of these theories is controversial.

Structure 
Cerro Chao is a -long coulee. The volume of Chao is exceptional for a lava dome structure, although the lava flux rate generating it is low in comparison to a basaltic eruption like Laki in Iceland. This low flux rate is insufficient to cause caldera formation. Cerro Chao is the largest Quaternary silicic lava flow in the world. The vent location is related to an inferred fault zone emanating from one of the neighbouring volcanoes.

The flow is underpinned by a pyroclastic apron that extends  from the flow front. This deposit is formed from several layers of pumices separated by erosion surfaces; at least one layer may be derived from Paniri volcano.

An overlapping pair of pyroclastic cones sits on top of the Chao flow and form its eruption vent. The northern side of the cone rises  from terrain while the southern side is partially breached. The highest point of the cone lies at  altitude. Its morphology suggests that it formed from a lava dome when it collapsed over the vent.

The eruption of Cerro Chao occurred in several phases. In a first phase, Plinian–Vulcanian activity generated pyroclastic flow deposits to the south of the system. Most of the pyroclastics were formed during this phase, although some minor deposits formed from the collapse of the forming flow. A thin lapilli layer has been linked to San Pedro volcano. Explosive activity continued during the extrusion of the Chao flow, growing the pumice cone.

The flow proper is subdivided in three subunits, the first two named Chao I and Chao II. Originally subdivided because of their morphology, they most likely represent various pulses of the same eruption. They have a combined volume exceeding  and are formed from a long southbound flow with some lateral spillage. The ridges are drawn out on the western flow margin. The folds in the surface layers may have been caused by the surface stiffening more quickly than the underlying flow due to cooling. The flow surface is blocky, with blocks occasionally displaying flow banding.

The flow overlies the pumice cone and parts of the Chao II on its eastern side. A lava dome formed above its vent and underwent several collapses, generating collapse scars. The flow is covered by weathering-derived aeolian debris from the other flows.

Petrology 
The Chao flow is of dacitic composition, with some non-vesicular small andesitic inclusions that are more numerous in the Chao III and upper Chao II stages, up to 5% of the volume of some Chao III lavas and vesiculated there. The lava has a porphyric texture owing to its high crystal content of 45% and displays extensive flow banding. Chao III lavas have lower concentrations of crystals. Phenocrysts in the lava contain biotite, hornblende, plagioclase and quartz. Apatite and zircon are accessory minerals.

Geologic history 
Potassium–argon dating and argon–argon dating performed on rocks from the Chao I stage have indicated an average age of 423,000 ± 100,000 years. However, anomalous chemical compositions of the dated rocks suggest that they may overestimate the true age of the volcanics. Such alteration may be the result of the inclusion of xenocrysts or K leaching. A glacial moraine system lies on Cerro del León at  altitude. One of these moraines abuts Cerro Chao, indicating that the dome must be older than the moraine and thus older than the last glaciation 11,000 years ago. An active magmatic body may still exist under Cerro Chao and Paniri.

See also 
 Altiplano–Puna volcanic complex
 Cerro Chascon-Runtu Jarita complex
 List of lava domes
 Paniri

References

External links 
 
 

Volcanoes of Chile
Pleistocene lava domes
Lava fields
Pre-Holocene volcanism